Peter Henry (born 17 June 1962) is a bobsledder and decathlete for New Zealand.

He competed for New Zealand in the 1988 Winter Olympics at Calgary; the teams he was in came 21st in the four-man event and 20th in the two-man event.

He was the flag bearer for New Zealand at the 1998 Winter Olympics.

He is also an athlete; competing and coming 10th in the Decathlon in the 1990 Commonwealth Games at Auckland.

References
Black Gold by Ron Palenski (2008, 2004 New Zealand Sports Hall of Fame, Dunedin) p. 105

External links

1962 births
Athletes (track and field) at the 1990 Commonwealth Games
Bobsledders at the 1988 Winter Olympics
Commonwealth Games competitors for New Zealand
Living people
New Zealand male bobsledders
New Zealand decathletes
Olympic bobsledders of New Zealand